Bernie Kelly (21 October 1932 – 8 October 2004) was a Scottish footballer.

References

1932 births
2004 deaths
Scottish footballers
Aberdeen F.C. players
Cowdenbeath F.C. players
Leicester City F.C. players
Nottingham Forest F.C. players
Raith Rovers F.C. players
Scottish Football League players
English Football League players
Footballers from North Lanarkshire
Scottish Football League representative players
Association football inside forwards
Scotland B international footballers
Muirkirk Juniors F.C. players
Scottish Junior Football Association players